E.W. Moore may refer to:

Edwin Ward Moore, commander of the Texas Navy
E.W. Moore Oval in Griffith, New South Wales  where Group 20 Rugby League Grand Final matches are played
E.W. Moore, photographer of the Hodgdon Site petroglyphs
E.W. Moore (photographer) and artist in Oregon